City Point National Cemetery is a United States National Cemetery in the community of City Point within the city of Hopewell, Virginia. Administered by the United States Department of Veterans Affairs, it encompasses , and as of the end of 2005, had 6,909 interments. It is managed by Hampton National Cemetery.

History 
During the Civil War, the area around City Point was a Union supply depot, established by General Ulysses S. Grant. Its proximity to the Confederate capitol of Richmond, Virginia made it an ideal staging place. The cemetery was established to reinter soldiers who were buried in the seven nearby hospital cemeteries and those from makeshift battlefield plots throughout the area.

City Point National Cemetery was listed on the National Register of Historic Places in 1995.

Notable monuments 
 The Army of the James Monument, a 20' high white marble monument erected in 1865.

References

External links 

 National Cemetery Administration
 City Point National Cemetery
 
 
 

National Register of Historic Places in Hopewell, Virginia
Cemeteries in Hopewell, Virginia
Cemeteries on the National Register of Historic Places in Virginia
United States national cemeteries
Virginia in the American Civil War
Historic American Landscapes Survey in Virginia